Nandita P. Palshetkar is an Indian physician who specialises in in vitro fertilisation and infertility. She is the elected president of Federation of Obstetric and Gynaecological Societies of India, in 2019. She is also the first vice president of Federation of Obstetric and Gynaecological Societies of India.

Career 
Palshetkar is the in vitro fertilisation and infertility director at eleven Bloom IVF centers in India, including Fortis Bloom IVF Centers (New Delhi, Gurgaon, Chandigarh, and Mumbai), Lilavati Hospital and Research Centre Mumbai, PalshetkarPatil Nursing Home Mumbai, D.Y. Patil Medical College, and Sakra World Hospital Bangalore. Palshetkar is also the President of the Indian Society For Assisted Reproduction, and the medical director of Lilavati Hospital Bloom IVF Centre, Mumbai.

Palshetkar is an invited speaker and faculty since 1994 on various events, hospitals and medical institutions in India.

Palshetkar supported the She’s Ambassador programme 2017, a PVR Nest initiative which was designed to develop leadership skills and increase health awareness among girls. The program has inspired over 50,000 girls from 50 schools across Mumbai to bring change within themselves and their communities and act as "Health Ambassadors" for others.

Palshetkar won the "Bharat Gaurav Award" in 2014, at the House of Commons, the Times Network National Award for Outstanding Contribution to Healthcare in 2017, and the Golden Globe Tigers Award, Malaysia, also in 2017.

In 2021, Fellowship honoris causa was awarded to Palshetkar for her achievement and support in the development of women's healthcare services at the United Kingdom's Royal College of Obstetricians and Gynaecologists.

Palshetkar has contributed in the 'Pradhan Mantri Surakshit Matritva Abhiyan' launched by the Ministry of Health and Family Welfare (MoHFW), Government of India to provide fixed day assured, comprehensive and quality antenatal care to pregnant women on 9th of every month.

Books and publications
Textbook of Hysteroscopy By Nandita Palshetkar, Publisher: JP Medical Ltd, 2013
"FOGSI Focus: Use of Adjuvants in Infertility", series editor: Nandita Palshetkar, JP Medical, 2021, 

"Oocyte Cryopreservation - Current Scenario and Future Perspectives: A Narrative Review", 2021, Hrishikesh D Pai,1 Rashmi Baid,1 Nandita P Palshetkar,1 Arnav Pai,2 Rishma D Pai
"Hysteroscopic metroplasty in women with primary infertility and septate uterus: reproductive performance after surgery", Dalal RJ1, Pai HD, Palshetkar NP, Takhtani M, Pai RD, Saxena N, 2012

Awards 

Best woman achiever in gynecology held by MAYOR OF Mumbai Shraddha Jadhav in 2010
Gr8 Women’s Achievers Award in Medical & Health Care 2011
Bharat Gaurav Award 2014 at House of Commons, London
The Golden Globe Tigers Award 2017 for Outstanding Contribution in Healthcare - Fertility & IVF in Malaysia, 2017
Received CSR Award for contribution in Women and Child Health initiative 2019.
CME Excellence Educator Award and Summit Awards for Medical Education 2019

References

Further reading
Repeated IVF Failures
Diana Hayden has come forward to talk about egg freezing: Dr. Nandita Palshetkar
Producer Ekta Kapoor becomes mother via surrogacy

External links
 with Zee 24 Taas

Indian gynaecologists
Medical doctors from Mumbai
Indian women gynaecologists
Living people
1963 births
Indian medical doctors